John Benjamin Charles Dore (29 April 1872 – 30 October 1945) was a New Zealand carrier, tourist operator, secret government agent, explorer and surgeon. He was born in Waikaia, Southland, New Zealand on 29 April 1872.

References

1872 births
1945 deaths
New Zealand explorers
People from Waikaia